Khallata Naga, also known as Kalunna, was an early monarch of Sri Lanka of the Anuradhapura Kingdom from 109 BC to 103 BC.

Reign
Khallata Naga was the third son of Saddha Tissa, and younger brother of Thulatthana and Lanja Tissa. In the period of his reign, three rebel Princesses, Tissa, Abha and Uttara tried to seize his throne.

See also
 List of Sri Lankan monarchs

External links 
 Kings & Rulers of Sri Lanka
 Codrington's Short History of Ceylon

K
Monarchs of Anuradhapura
K
K
 Sinhalese Buddhist monarchs
103 BC deaths
2nd-century BC births